Waitahora is a locality in the Tararua District of New Zealand's North Island. It is located between the Mangatoro and Mangatokoto streams, close to the junction of the Waitahora Stream with the Mangatokoto.

The Waitahora Wind Farm was a proposed wind farm for the area, which was abandoned without construction having started.

Demographics

There were 228 households. There were 312 males and 297 females, giving a sex ratio of 1.05 males per female. The median age was 37.6 years (compared with 37.4 years nationally), with 156 people (25.6%) aged under 15 years, 99 (16.3%) aged 15 to 29, 297 (48.8%) aged 30 to 64, and 60 (9.9%) aged 65 or older.

Ethnicities were 90.6% European/Pākehā, 18.2% Māori, 0.5% Pacific peoples, 1.5% Asian, and 0.5% other ethnicities (totals add to more than 100% since people could identify with multiple ethnicities).

The proportion of people born overseas was 7.4%, compared with 27.1% nationally.

Although some people objected to giving their religion, 56.7% had no religion, 32.5% were Christian and 2.5% had other religions.

Of those at least 15 years old, 78 (17.2%) people had a bachelor or higher degree, and 81 (17.9%) people had no formal qualifications. The median income was $35,600, compared with $31,800 nationally. The employment status of those at least 15 was that 267 (58.9%) people were employed full-time, 72 (15.9%) were part-time, and 9 (2.0%) were unemployed.

Education 
Waitahora School opened in 1903. It merged to Awariki School in 2002.

Motea School opened in 1916 and also closed in 2002.

References 

Tararua District
Populated places in Manawatū-Whanganui